Lucky Break may refer to:
Lucky Break (1994 film), an Australian film
Lucky Break (2001 film), a British film